Andrey Shariyazdanov (born July 12, 1976) is a Russian chess Grandmaster and European Junior Champion in 1996. He played for Russia B team at the 33rd Chess Olympiad in Elista

Chess career 
In 1998 he took first place in the 5th World University Chess Championship in Rotterdam, helping Russia to win the team gold.

In 2003 he tied for 3rd–10th with Vladimir Belov, Alexei Kornev, Farrukh Amonatov, Alexey Kim, Alexander Areshchenko, Mikhail Ulibin and Spartak Vysochin in the St.Petersburg 300 Open tournament. In 2004 he tied for 1st–5th with Christian Bauer, Boris Avrukh, Alexander Rustemov and Pavel Eljanov in the Masters Section of the Biel Chess Festival.

References

External links 

1976 births
Living people
Chess grandmasters
Russian chess players
Chess Olympiad competitors